The Kalindi Kunj metro station is located near Toll booth (Kalindi Kunj Border) and is located on the Magenta Line of the Delhi Metro.

Kalindi Kunj is part of Phase III of Delhi Metro, on the Magenta Line

History

Construction

The station

Structure
Kalindi Kunj elevated metro station situated on the Magenta Line of Delhi Metro.

Station layout

Facilities
List of available ATM at Kalindi Kunj metro station are,

Connections

Bus
Delhi Transport Corporation bus routes number 8, 8A, 34, 34A, 443, 493,  serves the station.

Entry/Exit

See also

Delhi
List of Delhi Metro stations
Transport in Delhi
Delhi Metro Rail Corporation
Delhi Suburban Railway
Delhi Monorail
Delhi Transport Corporation
Uttar Pradesh
Noida
Okhla Sanctuary
Okhla barrage
Kalindi Kunj
National Capital Region (India)
List of rapid transit systems
List of metro systems

References

External links

 Delhi Metro Rail Corporation Ltd. - official site
 Delhi Metro Annual Reports
 
 UrbanRail.Net – descriptions of all metro systems in the world, each with a schematic map showing all stations.

Delhi Metro stations
Railway stations in India opened in 2017
Railway stations in South East Delhi district